Charles Otzenberger-Detaille, né Charles Otzenberger (1881-1944) was a French wine merchant from Colmar, Alsace, France.

Otzenberger-Detaille joined the Order of Saint Lazarus (statuted 1910) after the promulgation of its statutes of 1910, and became an instrumental part of its magistracy.

He also joined Société archéologique de France in 1921.

After having married Germaine Detaille (1886-1980), the niece of academic artist Edouard Detaille (1848–1912), he subsequently called himself Otzenberger-Detaille.

He died in 1944, buried in the Detaille family tomb.

References 

1881 births
1944 deaths
People from Alsace
French Roman Catholics
Recipients of the Order of Saint Lazarus (statuted 1910)